Coleophora etrusca is a moth of the family Coleophoridae. It is found in Italy and Turkey.

The length of the forewings is about 5 mm. Adults are on wing in May and June.

References

etrusca
Moths described in 1990
Moths of Europe
Moths of Asia